William Black (November 10, 1760 – September 8, 1834) was a Yorkshireman and founder of the Methodist congregation in colonial Nova Scotia.

Black's daughter married the merchant and politician John Alexander Barry, who was the son of Robert Barry, a prominent businessman and Methodist. His son, Martin Gay Black, became a prominent businessman and also furthered the Methodist cause in Nova Scotia.

References 
 Biography at the Dictionary of Canadian Biography Online
 William Black made Canadian Methodism
 The John Rylands Library : Mr Wesley's Preachers : William Black
 History of Nova Scotia : William Black
 Biography by John Maclean
Memoir 1839

1760 births
1834 deaths
18th-century Methodist ministers
19th-century Methodist ministers
Canadian businesspeople
English businesspeople
English emigrants to pre-Confederation Nova Scotia
English Methodist ministers
Canadian Methodist ministers
People from Huddersfield
People from Cumberland County, Nova Scotia
Colony of Nova Scotia people
Methodist Church of Great Britain people
Clergy from Yorkshire